Cross country or cross-country may refer to:

Places
 Cross Country, Baltimore, a neighborhood in northwest Baltimore, Maryland
 Cross County Parkway, an east–west parkway in Westchester County, NY
 Cross County Shopping Center, a mall in Yonkers, NY
 The Mall at Cross County, a smaller mall adjacent to the Cross County Shopping Center in Yonkers, NY

Media and entertainment
 CMT Cross Country, an American television series
 Cross Country (album), an album by Webb Pierce 
 Cross Country (band), a band formed in 1973
 Cross Country (film), a 1983 drama film starring Nina Axelrod
 Cross-Country (G.I. Joe), a fictional character in the G.I. Joe universe
 Cross Country (novel), a 2008 novel by James Patterson
 Cross Country USA (1988), an edutainment videogame by Didatech

Sports 
 Cross country running, a sport in which teams of runners compete to complete a course over open or rough terrain
 Cross-country cycling, the most common discipline of mountain biking
 Cross-country riding, one of the three phases of the equestrian sport of eventing
 Cross-country flying, a type of distance flying in an aircraft
 Cross-country jump, a parachute jump
 Cross-country skiing, a winter sport for skiing
 Fell running, the sport of running and racing, off-road, over upland country
 Orienteering, sports that requires navigational skills using a map and compass
 Trail running, a sport which consists of running and hiking over trails

Transportation 
 Cross Country (automobile), various station wagons made by Nash and American Motors
 Cross Country Route, a railway route in the Great Britain
 CrossCountry, a train operating company in Great Britain
 Aeros Cross Country, an ultralight trike aircraft
 Virgin CrossCountry, a former train operating company in Great Britain
 Cross Country (Volvo), various station wagons made by Volvo

See also
 Cross-border
 Off-roading, driving or riding a vehicle on unsurfaced roads or tracks
 Operation Cross Country, the FBI's annual law enforcement action focused on recovering underage victims of prostitution.